"Living Without You" is a song recorded by the British singer Tulisa on 4 January 2015, her first single in over two years.

Background
On 20 October 2014, it was officially revealed that Tulisa's new single would be titled "Living Without You" with a release date of 7 December 2014. The song was premiered on the same day as the reveal, with a lyric video being uploaded to YouTube. The single artwork was revealed on 1 November 2014. The single release date was pushed back to 14 December 2014 and finally to 4 January 2015.

Music video
The accompanying music video was directed by Life Garland and released on 29 October 2014.

Live performances
Various promotional performances of the song were also performed, including a live show at G-A-Y on 29 November 2014. On 14 December, Tulisa appeared on This Morning and performed an acoustic version. On New Year's Eve, Tulisa performed the song on Alan Carr's New Year's Specstacular.

Track listing
 Digital download
 "Living Without You" – 3:24

Digital download (Remixes)
"Living Without You" (Extended Mix) – 5:18
"Living Without You" (Brook Mason Remix) – 5:37
"Living Without You" (Fielden Club Mix) – 5:08

Charts

Release history

References 

2014 songs
2015 singles
All Around the World Productions singles
Songs written by Richard Rawson
Tulisa songs